Voltz, is a Brazilian start-up company that produces electric scooters and motorcycles, founded in 2017 in Recife. It has sold 1838 units in 2022 through May, including 471 in April. 

A factory was opened in Manaus in May 2022, initially to produce 5000 units, but with a capacity of 15,000 units, targeting an annual production of 180,000 units.

In addition to the four scooter models "EV1", "EVS", "EVS Sport" and "EVS Work" with battery from 32 Ah to 70 Ah and range from 100 km to 180 km, the company produces the electric cargo trike “Miles” with a cargo box with 750 liters capacity located above the front axle.

References

External links
 Lexicar website

2017 establishments in Brazil
Brazilian brands
Electric vehicle manufacturers of Brazil
Motorcycle manufacturers of Brazil
Economy of Pernambuco
Organisations based in Recife
Manaus
Scooter manufacturers
Vehicle manufacturing companies established in 2017